Ljupčo Malinkov (born June 17, 1983) is a Macedonian basketball coach who serves as head coach of KK Gostivar.

Honours
2017, Macedonian Basketball Cup: Runner-Up

References

External links
BGbasket Profile
balkanleague.net

1983 births
Living people
Macedonian basketball coaches
Sportspeople from Kavadarci
21st-century Macedonian people